Oakfield High School may refer to:

 Oakfield High School (Maine), Oakfield, Maine, US
 Oakfield High School (New York), Oakfield, New York, US; See Frank Trigilio
 Oakfield High School (Wisconsin), Oakfield, Wisconsin, US; See List of high schools in Wisconsin
 Oakfield High School and College, Wigan, England

See also
 Oakfield (disambiguation)#Schools